A. Leiomalama 'Malama' Solomon (born March 3, 1951) is an American politician and a Democratic member of the Hawaii Senate representing District 4. Solomon was originally appointed to the District 1 Senate seat by Governor Neil Abercrombie on December 21, 2010, to fill the vacancy caused by the appointment of Dwight Takamine as Hawaii Director of the Department of Labor and Industrial Relations. She served in that seat until her election to the District 4 seat, which she has held since 2013.

Education
Solomon earned her BA in education at the University of Hawaii at Manoa, her BA in cultural anthropology from the University of Hawaii at Hilo, her MA in education from the University of Hawaii and her PhD from Oregon State University.

Electoral history
In 1998 Solomon initially sought the District 1 Senate seat in the three-way September 19 Democratic Primary, losing to Lorraine Inouye, who held the seat until 2005.

In 2006 Solomon won the four-way September 26 Democratic Primary for Lieutenant Governor of Hawaii with 77,895 votes (32.7%), but she and gubernatorial running mate Randy Iwase lost the general election on November 7 to incumbent Republicans Linda Lingle and Duke Aiona.

In 2012 Solomon won the August 11 Democratic Primary for State Senate District 4 with 4,068 votes (47.5%) against former Senator Lorraine Inouye, and then won the November 6 General election with 9,828 votes (60.9%) against Green candidate Kelly Greenwell.

References

External links
Official page at the Hawaii State Legislature
 

1951 births
Living people
Democratic Party Hawaii state senators
Oregon State University alumni
People from Hawaii (island)
University of Hawaiʻi alumni
University of Hawaiʻi at Hilo alumni
University of Hawaiʻi at Mānoa alumni
Women state legislators in Hawaii
21st-century American women